Merkens is a surname. Notable people with the surname include:

Betty Merken, American painter and printmaker
Guido Merkens (born 1955), American football player
Tom Christian Merkens (born 1990), German footballer
Toni Merkens (1912–1944), German racing cyclist

See also
Mertens